Takashi Shimizu (清水 崇 Shimizu Takashi, born 27 July 1972) is a Japanese filmmaker. He is best known for being the creator of the Ju-On franchise, and directing four of its films, internationally, in both Japan and the U.S. According to film scholar Wheeler Winston Dixon, Shimizu is "one of a new breed of Japanese horror directors" who prefers to "suggest menace and violence rather than directly depict it."

Filmography
 Blue Tiger (Movie, 1994, Script)
 Last Bronx ~Tokyo Bangaichi~ (ラストブロンクス -東京番外地-) (1997) (Video)
 Katasumi and 4444444444, stories from Gakkou no kaidan G (学校の怪談G) (lit, "School Ghost Story G") (1998) (TV)
 Ju-on: The Curse (呪怨) (2000) (Video)
 Ju-on: The Curse 2 (呪怨2) (2000) (Video)
 首吊り気球　伊藤潤二恐怖Ｃｏｌｌｅｃｔｉｏｎ (Video)
 心霊ビデオＶ　本当にあった怖い話　恐怖心霊写真館 (Shin rei bideo V: Honto ni atta kowai hanashi - kyoufushin rei shashin-kan) (2000) (Video)
 心霊ビデオＶＩ　本当にあった怖い話　恐怖タレント体験談 (Shin rei bideo VI: Honto ni atta kowai hanashi - kyoufu tarento taikendan) (2000) (Video)
 Tomie: Re-birth (富江 rebirth) (2001)
 Ju-on: The Grudge (呪怨) (2002)
 Ju-on: The Grudge 2 (呪怨2) (2003)
 The Grudge (2004)
 Marebito (2004)
 Dark Tales of Japan, episode Blonde Kwaidan, (2004) (TV)
 The Great Horror Family, TV Series (2004–2005)
 Reincarnation, (輪廻 Rinne) (2005)
 The Grudge 2 (2006)
 Ghost vs. Alien 03 (2007)
 Ten Nights of Dream (2006)
 The Shock Labyrinth 3D (戦慄迷宮3D) (2009)
 Tormented (2011)
 Scared of the Dark (2013)
 Flight 7500 (2014) 
 Kiki's Delivery Service (2014), live-action adaptation of the novel of the same name
 NightCry (2015), live-action trailer for the video game NightCry, formerly known as Project Scissors
 Resident Evil: Vendetta (Biohazard: Vendetta) (2017)
 Innocent Curse (こどもつかい) (2017)
 Howling Village (犬鳴村) (2019)
 Suicide Forest Village (樹海村) (2021)
 Homunculus (2021)
 Ox-Head Village (牛首村) (2022)
 Immersion (忌怪島) (2023)
 Minna no Uta (ミンナのウタ) (2023)

Accolades
 2022 — Star Asia Lifetime Achievement Award at 21st New York Asian Film Festival.

References

External links
 
 Shimizu's JMDb entry (in Japanese)
 Ju-On Sequels Renamed
 Scared of the Dark

1972 births
Living people

Japanese film directors
Horror film directors
People from Maebashi